Charles Dustin Coffin (September 10, 1804February 28, 1880) was a U.S. Representative from Ohio for one term from 1837 to 1839.

Born in Newburyport, Massachusetts, Coffin attended the public schools.
He moved with his parents to New Lisbon, Ohio.
He studied law.
He was admitted to the bar in September 1823 and commenced practice in New Lisbon.
He served as clerk of the courts of Columbiana County in 1828.
He was elected as a Whig to the Twenty-fifth Congress to fill the vacancy caused by the resignation of Andrew W. Loomis and served from December 20, 1837, to March 3, 1839.
He declined to be a candidate for renomination in 1838.
He resumed the practice of law and engaged in banking.
He served as president of the Columbiana Bank of New Lisbon.
He moved to Cincinnati, Ohio, in 1842 and continued the practice of law.

Coffin was elected judge of the superior court in 1845 and served seven years.
He was appointed to the same position by Governor Denison in 1861.
He died in Cincinnati, Ohio, February 28, 1880.
He was interred in Spring Grove Cemetery.

Sources

1804 births
1880 deaths
Politicians from Newburyport, Massachusetts
People from Lisbon, Ohio
Ohio lawyers
Burials at Spring Grove Cemetery
Politicians from Cincinnati
Judges of the Superior Court of Cincinnati
Whig Party members of the United States House of Representatives from Ohio
19th-century American politicians
19th-century American judges
19th-century American lawyers